Manhush may refer:

 Manhush, Donetsk Oblast, a town in Ukraine near the Sea of Azov
 Manhush, Khuzestan Province, a village in Iran